Henri-Gabriel Ibels (30 November 1867 – February 1936) was a French illustrator, printmaker, painter and author.

Biography
He was born in Paris and studied at the Académie Julian with Pierre Bonnard and Édouard Vuillard. He was a member of Les Nabis from its 1889 founding. Other members included Bonnard, Vuillard, Félix Vallotton, Maurice Denis, Paul Sérusier, and Émile Bernard. Ibels took part in Les Nabis’ exhibitions at Le Barc de Boutteville gallery. With Vuillard and Denis he soon caught the public eye and earned the nickname ‘le Nabis journaliste’.

He contributed to several publications on anarchism.

Ibels’ images were powerful and heavily graphic, in keeping with the movement that was a generous admixture of fine art, graphic design and advertising, as seen in the lithographs and posters for theater, cabaret, and book illustration.

Ibels drew his inspiration from life on the street, cafés, the circus and boxing ring, as did Adolphe Willette, Henri de Toulouse-Lautrec and Théophile-Alexandre Steinlen. His graphic style owed much to the art of Honoré Daumier, Japanese woodcuts, Paul Gauguin and the Pont-Aven School.

Ibels collaborated with Toulouse-Lautrec and became involved in avant-garde theater. He exhibited at the Salon des Indépendants for the first time in 1891.

References

French illustrators
1867 births
1936 deaths
Académie Julian alumni
19th-century French painters
French male painters
20th-century French painters
20th-century French male artists
20th-century French printmakers
19th-century French male artists
Les Nabis
French anarchists